Ripley is a town in southeastern Payne County, Oklahoma, United States. The population was 423 at the 2010 census, a decline of 9.2 percent from the figure of 444 in 2000. The town was named after Edward Ripley, the 14th president of the Atchison, Topeka and Santa Fe Railway.

History
The Atchison, Topeka and Santa Fe Railway (often called simply the Santa Fe) developed Ripley and auctioned the first lots on January 13, 1900. Three months later, the Ripley Times, reported that the community's population had already reached 1,000 persons. The first wagon bridge across the Cimarron River was completed July 31, 1900, which was the excuse for a big party that lasted until the wee hours of the next morning.

Agriculture became the main source of income besides the railroad. A large farm named Morehead Plantation hired many African-American laborers to produce cotton. The cotton business declined sharply after World War I, but oil discoveries in the county offset the cotton decline for a while. However, oil markets declined in the late 1920s and the beginning of the Great Depression caused the town economy to decline. Ripley's population declined from a peak of 487 in 1930 to 292 in 1950 and 263 in 1960. The population rebounded to 451 in 1980 and 376 in 1990. It peaked again in 2009 at 510; by 2016, it dropped to 403 people.

Geography
Cushing Lake, which offers a boat ramp, dock, and picnic area, is just to the southeast.

Demographics

As of the census of 2000, there were 444 people, 158 households, and 118 families residing in the town. There were 180 housing units at an average density of 482.4 per square mile (187.8/km2). The racial makeup of the town was 89.64% White, 0.00% African American, 4.95% Native American, 0.00% Asian, 0.00% Pacific Islander, 0.00% from other races, and 5.41% from two or more races. 1.35% of the population were Hispanic or Latino of any race.

There were 158 households, out of which 40.5% had children under the age of 18 living with them, 51.3% were married couples living together, 15.8% had a female householder with no husband present, and 24.7% were non-families. 23.4% of all households were made up of individuals, and 10.8% had someone living alone who was 65 years of age or older. The average household size was 2.81 and the average family size was 3.21.

In the town, the population was spread out, with 32.9% under the age of 18, 9.5% from 18 to 24, 26.1% from 25 to 44, 19.6% from 45 to 64, and 11.9% who were 65 years of age or older. The median age was 32 years. For every 100 females, there were 88.1 males. For every 100 females age 18 and over, there were 86.3 males.

The median income for a household in the town was $24,643, and the median income for a family was $36,250. Males had a median income of $26,500 versus $15,250 for females. The per capita income for the town was $10,030. 18.9% of the population and 18.0% of families were below the poverty line. 19.7% of those under the age of 18 and 9.1% of those 65 and older were living below the poverty line.

Notable people
 William A. Berry (1915–2004). Born in Ripley. Became an attorney and Justice of the Oklahoma Supreme Court. Notable for exposing corrupt practices by certain justices in his book, Justice for Sale: Shocking Scandal of the Oklahoma Supreme Court.
 Billy McGinty (1871–1961) McGinty was a member of the Roosevelt Rough Riders Association in the Spanish–American War, and was the association's last president. McGinty's Cowboy Band, headquartered in Ripley, played the nation's first radio broadcast by a Western string band on May 7, 1925 over Bristow's station KFRU.
Casey Sadler (1990-) MLB pitcher for the Seattle Mariners

Landmarks
 Allen Williamson Bridge - Memorial bridge near Ripley, named after the Oklahoma Representative Allen Williamson.
 The Hopkins Sandstone House and Farmstead is listed on the National Register of Historic Places listings in Payne County, Oklahoma.

Notes

References

Towns in Payne County, Oklahoma
Towns in Oklahoma
Populated places established in 1900